John Lyons (born 1961) is an Australian journalist. He has been the Executive Editor of ABC News and Head of Investigative Journalism for the Australian Broadcasting Corporation since 2017. He was previously associate editor (digital) and a senior reporter at The Australian, editor of the Sydney Morning Herald, executive producer of the Sunday program on the Nine Network and a foreign correspondent in the United States and Israel.

He is a three-time Walkley Award winner: in 1999 for Commentary, Analysis, Opinion & Critique, for his national affairs reporting for The Bulletin, in 2001 for Broadcast Interviewing for his television interviews on the Sunday program, and in 2014 for Investigative Journalism as part of a Four Corners team's reporting on the Israeli military's treatment of Palestinian children. He also won the Graham Perkin Australian Journalist of the Year Award in 1999 for his work with The Bulletin.

In 2017 his memoir, Balcony Over Jerusalem: A Middle East Memoir, was published by HarperCollins.

On 5 June 2019 Lyons live-tweeted when the Australian Federal Police raided the Sydney office of the ABC, the day after their raid on the home of Annika Smethurst. He reported that they had downloaded 9214 documents which then had to be assessed in terms of the warrant issued.

Lyons' book Dateline Jerusalem: Journalism’s Toughest Assignment was published by Monash University Publishing in 2021.

Personal 
Lyons was born in 1961. He is married to Sylvie Le Clezio and has one son. Lyons lives in Sydney.

References

External links 

 

Australian journalists
1961 births
Living people
The Sydney Morning Herald editors